Too Late is a 1996 Romanian drama film directed by Lucian Pintilie. It was entered into the 1996 Cannes Film Festival.

Dumitru Costa, a young trainee prosecutor is entrusted with the investigation about the suspicious death of a Jiu Valley coal miner in 1990s Romania. Accident or murder? Costa is being helped during this investigation by Alina, a good-looking young topographer engineer; it is love at first sight between them both. Two other miners are killed in a long closed down gallery. The investigation relentlessly led by Costa soon begins to bother the local authorities. The mine management dread unrest among the miners who lives under the threat of the closing down of mining development. The officials strive to hush the matter up. Costa and Alina receive threats over the phone.

Cast
 Cecilia Bârbora as Alina Ungureanu
 Răzvan Vasilescu as Costa (the prosecutor)
 Ion Bechet
 Florin Calinescu as Maireanu
 Andreea Banciu as Gilda
 Sorin Cristea as Psychiatrist
 Ion Fiscuteanu as Oana
 Mihai Gruia Sandu as (as Mihai Sandu)
 Lucian Iancu
 Victor Rebengiuc as Elephant Foot
 Mircea Rusu as Munteanu
 Razvan Vasilescu as Dumitri Costa
 Dorel Visan as The prefect
 Luminiţa Gheorghiu

References

External links
 

1996 films
1996 drama films
Romanian drama films
1990s Romanian-language films
Films directed by Lucian Pintilie
Films produced by Marin Karmitz